State Highway 86 (abbreviated SH-86) is a state highway in the U.S. state of Oklahoma that connects SH-51 with Perry and is  long.  The highway is contained wholly in Payne and Noble Counties. SH-86 has no lettered spurs or loops.

SH-86 was established in 1940. Initially a gravel highway, it remained unpaved until 1952.

Route description
SH-86 crosses into Noble County  into its journey. The route passes just west of Lake Perry. Shortly thereafter, SH-86 comes to an end in Perry at US-77.

History
State Highway 86 first appears on the official Oklahoma highway map on the 1941 edition. Originally, the driving surface consisted of untreated gravel. The route had the same extent and termini as the present-day highway. By 1953, the highway had been paved.

Junction list

References

External links

 SH-86 at OKHighways

086
Transportation in Payne County, Oklahoma
Transportation in Noble County, Oklahoma